The 2003 Estonian Figure Skating Championships were held in Tallinn from December 7 to 9, 2002. Skaters competed in the disciplines of men's singles, ladies' singles, pair skating, and ice dancing.

Senior results

Men

Ladies
6 participants

Pairs

Ice dancing

Junior results
The 2003 Estonian Junior Figure Skating Championships took place in Tallinn from January 10 through 12, 2003.

Men

Ladies
6 participants

Pairs

Ice dancing
4 participants

References

Figure Skating Championships
Estonian Figure Skating Championships, 2003
Estonian Figure Skating Championships